The Revolution of 1934, also known as the Revolution of October 1934 or the Revolutionary General Strike of 1934, was a revolutionary strike movement that took place between 5 and 19 October 1934, during the black biennium of the Second Spanish Republic. The revolts were triggered by the entry of the conservative Spanish Confederation of the Autonomous Right (CEDA) into the Spanish government. Most of the events occurred in Catalonia and Asturias and were supported by many Spanish Socialist Workers' Party (PSOE) and General Union of Workers (UGT) members, notably Largo Caballero, as well as members of the Confederación Nacional del Trabajo (CNT). Historians have argued that the incident sharpened antagonism between the political Right and Left in Spain and was part of the reason for the later Spanish Civil War. Around 2,000 people were killed during the uprising, which was repressed by Spanish government forces.

Prelude
The elections held in October 1933 resulted in a centre-right majority. The political party with the most votes was the Confederación Española de Derechas Autónomas ("CEDA"), but president Alcalá-Zamora decided not to invite the leader of the CEDA, Gil Robles, to form a government, and never called him. Instead, the presidente invited the Radical Republican Party's Alejandro Lerroux to do so, in what author Hugh Thomas called a weakening of the democratic process. Despite receiving the most votes, CEDA was denied cabinet positions for nearly a year. After a year of intense pressure, CEDA, the largest party in the congress, was finally successful in forcing the acceptance of three ministries. However the entrance of CEDA in the government, despite being normal in a parliamentary democracy, was not well accepted by the left, who accused the president of handing over the Republic to its enemies. The left viewed the CEDA as a signal of the advance of Fascism and appealed to the case of Austria and the rise of Engelbert Dollfuss to justify the use of violence for defensive purposes. However historian Salvador de Madariaga, himself a supporter of Manuel Azaña, and an exiled vocal opponent of Francisco Franco asserted that: "The argument that [Gil Robles] tried to destroy the Constitution to establish fascism was, at once, hypocritical and false".

The Socialists triggered an insurrection that they had been preparing for nine months. The issue was that the Left Republicans identified the Republic not with democracy or constitutional law but with a specific set of left wing policies and politicians. Any deviation, even if democratic, was seen as treasonous. The founding fathers of the system had conceived the new democracy as belonging to them, and were more concerned with the radical reforms which their view were necessary than with pluralism and freedom.

Preparation of the revolution 
1934 was a year of constant class clashes, established on the basis of small incidents and short general strikes, which allowed the movement to arrive on the eve of October in the fullness of its strength, with great confidence and extraordinarily united.

The rebels had a considerable stock of rifles and pistols on them. Most of the rifles came from a shipment of arms supplied by Indalecio Prieto, a socialist party moderate. The rifles had been landed by the yacht Turquesa at Pravia, north-east of Oviedo; Prieto swiftly fled to France to avoid arrest. Other weapons came from captured arms factories in the region and the miners also had their dynamite blasting charges, which were known as "la artillería de la revolución."

Asturias 

The rising in Asturias was well prepared with headquarters in Oviedo.

In several mining towns in Asturias, local unions gathered small arms and were determined to see the strike through. Fighting began on the evening of 4 October, with the miners occupying several towns, attacking and seizing local Civil and Assault Guard barracks.

At dawn on 5 October, the rebels attacked the Brothers' school in Turón. The Brothers and the Passionist Fathers were captured and imprisoned in the "House of the People" while waiting for a decision from the Revolutionary Committee. Under pressure from extremists, the Committee condemned them to death. 34 priests, six young seminarians aged 18 to 21, and several businessmen and civil guards were summarily executed by the revolutionaries in Mieres and Sama. 58 religious buildings including churches, convents, and part of the university at Oviedo were burned and destroyed.

The same day saw columns of miners advancing along the road to Oviedo, the provincial capital. With the exception of two barracks in which fighting with the garrison of 1,500 government troops continued, the city was taken by 6 October. The miners proceeded to occupy several other towns, most notably the large industrial centre of La Felguera, and set up town assemblies, or "revolutionary committees", to govern the towns that they controlled.

Within three days the center of Asturias was in the hands of the rebels. The revolutionary soviets set up by the miners attempted to impose order on the areas under their control, and the moderate socialist leadership of Ramón González Peña and Belarmino Tomás took measures to restrain violence.

Taking Oviedo, the rebels were able to seize the city' arsenal gaining 24,000 rifles, carbines, and light and heavy machine guns. Recruitment offices demanded the services of all workers between the ages of eighteen and forty for the 'Red Army'. Thirty thousand workers were mobilized for battle within ten days.

In the occupied areas, the rebels officially declared the proletarian revolution and abolished regular money.

The government was now facing a civil war.  Franco, already General of Division and aide to Minister of War Diego Hidalgo, was put in command of operations to suppress the violent insurgency. Franco and General Manuel Goded Llopis advised Hidalgo to bring in the battle-tested Spanish Army of Africa, composed of the Spanish Legion and the Moroccan Regulares. Historian Hugh Thomas asserts that Hidalgo said that he did not want young inexperienced recruits fighting their own people, and that he was wary of moving troops to Asturias, leaving the rest of Spain unprotected. Bringing in the Army of Africa was not a novelty; in 1932 Manuel Azaña had also called the Tercio and the Regulares from North Africa.

War Ministe Hidalgo wanted Franco to lead the troops. But President Alcalá Zamora, aware of Franco's monarchist sympathies, chose General Eduardo López Ochoa to lead the troops against the miners, hoping that his reputation as a loyal Republican would minimize the bloodshed.

Army of Africa troops carried out the campaign. After two weeks of heavy fighting (and a death toll estimated between 1,200 and 2,000), the rebellion was suppressed.

As a deterrent to further atrocities, López Ochoa summarily executed a number of Legionnaires and Regulares for torturing or murdering prisoners.

Historian Javier Tusell argues that although Franco had a leading role, giving instructions from Madrid, that does not mean he took part in the illegal repressive activities. According to Tusell it was the Republican General, López de Óchoa, a republican freemason who had been appointed by President Alcalá Zamora to lead the repression in the field, that was unable to prevent innumerous atrocities.

According to Hugh Thomas, 2,000 persons died in the uprising: 230–260 military and police, 33 priests, 1,500 miners in combat and 200 individuals killed in the repression. Stanley Payne estimates that the rebel atrocities killed between 50 and 100 people and that the government conducted up to 100 summary executions, while 15 million pesetas were stolen from banks, most which was never recovered and funded further revolutionary activity.

Catalonia 

In Catalonia the revolt was triggered by the Government of Catalonia led by its president Lluís Companys, who proclaimed the Catalan State. The Catalonian uprising began and ended the same day, it lasted only ten hours, in the so-called "Events of 6 October".

In October 6, Lluís Companys decided to declare the Catalan Republic within the "Spanish Federal Republic", and numerous heavily armed squads occupied the streets of Barcelona and other towns, supporting the initiative and capturing public offices. Lluís Companys appeared on a balcony of the Palau de la Generalitat (Government Building) and he told the crowd that "monarchists and fascists" had "assaulted the government", and went on:
In this solemn hour, in the name of the people and the Parliament, the Government over which I preside assumes all the faculties of power in Catalonia, proclaims the Catalan State of the Spanish Federal Republic, and in establishing and fortifying relations with the leaders of the general protest against Fascism, invites them to establish in Catalonia the provisional Government of the Republic, which will find in our Catalan people the most generous impulse of fraternity in the common desire to erect a liberal and magnificent federal republic.

Lluís Companys asked Manuel Azaña, who happened to be in Barcelona during the events, to lead a newly proclaimed Spanish Republican government, a proposition that Azaña rejected.  Lluís Companys also telephoned General Domènec Batet, asking him for support. Domènec Betet who was deployed in Catalonia as chief of the IV Organic Division remained loyal to the central government and gained some time demanding a written request. While Companys wrote the request, Batet prepared the Army, Guardia Civil, and Guardia de Asalto troops. At 9 pm General Batet declared martial law. He moved against trade union and militia headquarters, both of whom surrendered quickly, then brought light artillery to bear against the city hall and the Generalitat. Fighting continued until 6am, when Companys surrendered.

In the failed rebellion forty-six people died: thirty-eight civilians and eight soldiers. More than three thousand people were imprisoned, most of them in the "Uruguay" steamer, and placed under the jurisdiction of the councils of war.

The International Marxist Tendency movement classified Lluis Company's actions as the "worst betrayal of the movement", according to this movement Companys surrendered without resistance and his “Estat Catala” did not challenge private property nor the current social establishment he just wanted to place "the leadership of the struggle in the hands of the petty bourgeoisie represented by the ERC (Catalan Republican Left)".

Although the vast majority of the events happened in Asturias and Catalonia, strikes, clashes, and shootings happened also in the Basque country, north of Castile and León, Cantabria, or Madrid.

Aftermath 
The insurgency in Asturias sparked a new era of violent anti-Christian persecutions, initiated the practice of atrocities against the clergy and sharpened the antagonism between Left and Right. Franco and López Ochoa (who, prior to the campaign in Asturias, had been seen as a left-leaning officer) emerged as officers prepared to use 'troops against Spanish civilians as if they were a foreign enemy'. Franco described the rebellion to a journalist in Oviedo as, 'a frontier war and its fronts are socialism, communism and whatever attacks civilisation in order to replace it with barbarism.' Though the colonial units sent to the north by the government at Franco's recommendation consisted of the Spanish Foreign Legion and the Moroccan Regulares Indigenas, the right wing press portrayed the Asturian rebels as lackeys of a foreign Jewish-Bolshevik conspiracy. At the start of the Civil War, López Ochoa was assassinated. Some time after these events, Franco was briefly commander-in-chief of the Army of Africa (from 15 February onwards), and from 19 May 1935, on, Chief of the General Staff.

After the "miners" had surrendered the investigations and repression were carried out by the brutal Civil Guard Major Lisardo Doval Bravo who applied torture and savage beatings. Several prisoners died.  The independent journalist “Luis de Sirval” was arbitrarily arrested and shot dead in prison by a Bulgarian Legionnaire named Dimitri Ivan Ivanoff. Due to martial law and censorship, little or no information was officially made public, a group of Socialist deputies carried a private investigation and published an independent report that discarded most to the publicized atrocities but that confirmed the savage beatings and tortures.

In Catalonia Lluís Companys and his government were arrested. So too was Manuel Azaña, despite having taken no part in the events; he was released in December.The Statute of Autonomy was suspended indefinitely on 14 December, and all powers that had been transferred to Barcelona were returned to Madrid. The soldiers who had taken part of the insurrection, the commander Enric Pérez i Farràs and the captains Escofet and Ricart, were condemned to death, their sentence being commuted to life imprisonment by the President of the Republic, Alcalá Zamora, in spite of the protests of both the CEDA and the Republican Liberal Democrat Party of Melquiades Álvarez, who demanded a strong hand.

Martial law was in place until January 23, 1935. The government tried to be and was reasonable in dealing with insurrects in most cases, but in Asturias justice was uneven and the police administration was allowed to continue with excesses.

On February 23, 1935, the Mayor of Barcelona and the detained councilors were provisionally released.

In June 1935 The President and the Government of the Generalitat were tried by the Constitutional Guarantees Tribunal and were sentenced for military rebellion to thirty years in prison, which was carried out by some in the Cartagena prison and others in the Puerto de Santa María.

The government of Lerroux unleashed "a harsh repressive wave with the closure of political and trade union centers, the suppression of newspapers, the removal of municipalities and thousands of detainees, without having had a direct action on the facts", which showed "a punitive will often arbitrary and with vengeance components of class or ideological".

Ramón Gonzáles Peña the prominent leader of the Oviedo Revolutionary Committee was sentenced to death. One year later, however, he was reprieved. Gonzáles later served as the president of Unión General de Trabajadores, in which he was in conflict with Largo Caballero. He was also a Member of Parliament and was the Minister of Justice 1938–1939. After the Spanish Civil War González Peña went to exile in Mexico, where he died on 27 July 1952.

There were no mass killing after the fighting was over, completely different from the massacres that had taken place in similar uprisings in France, Hungary or Germany; all death sentences were commuted aside from two, army sergeant and deserter Diego Vásquez, who fought alongside the miners, and a worker known as "El Pichilatu" who had committed serial killings. Little effort was actually made to suppress the organisations that had carried out the insurrection, resulting in most being functional again by 1935. Support for fascism was minimal and did not increase, while civil liberties were restored in full by 1935, after which the revolutionaries had a generous opportunity to pursue power through electoral means.

Following the Spanish general election of 1936, the new government of Manuel Azaña released Companys and his government from jail.

At the outbreak of the Spanish Civil War, López Ochoa was in a military hospital in Carabanchel and was awaiting trial, accused of responsibility for the deaths of 20 civilians at a barracks in Oviedo. Given the violence occurring throughout Madrid, the government attempted to move Ochoa from the hospital to a safer location but was twice prevented from doing so by large hostile crowds. A third attempt was made under the guise that Ochoa was already dead, but the ruse was exposed and the general was taken away. One account states that an anarchist dragged him from the coffin in which he was lying and shot him in the hospital garden. His head was hacked off, stuck on a pole and publicly paraded. His remains were then displayed with a sign reading "This is the butcher of Asturias."

The eight martyrs of Turon  were venerated on 7 September 1989, and beatified By Pope John Paul II on 29 April 1990. They were canonized on 21 November 1999.

See also
Asturian miners' strike of 1934
Events of 6 October
Martyrs of Turon
Ramón González Peña

Notes

References

Sources 

 
 
 
 
 
 
 
 
 
 
 
 
 
 

1934 labor disputes and strikes
1930s coups d'état and coup attempts
1934 in politics
1934 in Spain
Confederación Nacional del Trabajo
General strikes in Spain
History of Asturias
Revolutions in Spain
1934 in Catalonia